Doox of Yale (formerly The Duke's Men of Yale) are an all-gender undergraduate a cappella group at Yale University. The group was founded by first-year students in 1952, and was the first TTBB a cappella group at Yale to become all-gender in 2017.

History 
The Duke's Men formed in 1952 when Basil "Duke" Henning, a former member of the Whiffenpoofs and the master of Saybrook College, stole an arrangement from the 'Whiffs' and presented it to four of his first-year students.

In the fall of 2017, the Duke's Men became Yale's first historically all-male a cappella group to abolish gender restrictions. The group is widely considered to be a feeder to the Whiffenpoofs, and its announcement placed additional pressure on the world's oldest collegiate a cappella group to begin admitting non-male singers; within a year, the Whiffenpoofs followed suit and admitted the group's first female singer in its 109-year history. In 2018, the Duke's Men changed its official name to Doox of Yale, a longtime nickname that better reflected the ensemble's gender inclusivity.

Competition and media 
Doox has been successful in a number of competitions, most notably the International Championship of College A Cappella.  In 1996 Doox was the best male group and won first runner-up honors at the ICCA Finals at Avery Fisher Hall in New York City, along with awards for soloist Michael Sagalowicz and arrangement. The same year, the group performed for President Bill Clinton at the White House Christmas party. In 2005, the group took first place in the New England regional final of the ICCA. Most recently, the group took first place in the 2009 Northeast Quarterfinal, with member Sam Tsui ('11) receiving accolades for Best Solo & Best Choreography. and won again at the Northeast Semi-Final at MIT on March 21, and came in 4th place at the Finals at Alice Tully Hall on April 18, 2009.

In January 2004, the group was featured in a CBS News Sunday Morning segment about collegiate a cappella.

In 2006, the Duke's Men recorded a jingle for the CNBC program "Fast Money."

In June 2015, three members of the group (Solon Snider, Wade Newville, and Paul Holmes) were featured on Bravo TV's scripted comedy series, "Odd Mom Out," where they sang a segment of "Give My Regards to Broadway" (arranged by Solon Snider, Pitchpipe 2014-2015).

Notable alumni
 Richard Brookhiser, historian and journalist
 Django Haskins, singer-songwriter and frontman of pop-noir musical group the Old Ceremony.
 Conor Knighton, correspondent for CBS Sunday Morning.
 Holcombe Waller, singer-songwriter and visual/performing artist.
 Sam Tsui, Musician.
 Casey Breves, member of Chanticleer
 Jeremy Lloyd, part of the pop duo Marian Hill
 Henry Gottfried, actor.
 Christian Probst, cast member of Broadway's The Book of Mormon
 Michael Blume, singer-songwriter

Discography 
Over the decades the group has recorded over 30 albums.

References

External links

Yale University musical groups
Collegiate a cappella groups
Musical groups established in 1952
1952 establishments in Connecticut